Edmund Sturton (or Stourton, fl. late 15th-early 16th century) was an English composer of the Tudor period. Little is known about his life and career, but he is believed to be the same Sturton whose six-part setting of Ave Maria ancilla Trinitatis is found in the Lambeth Choirbook. Another six-part setting, this of the Gaude virgo mater Christi, may be found in the Eton Choirbook; its voices cover a range of fifteen notes.

References

15th-century births
16th-century deaths
15th-century English people
16th-century English composers
English male composers